Hassan II (9 July 1929 – 23 July 1999) was the King of Morocco from 1961 until his death in 1999. He was a member of the 'Alawi dynasty. 

He was the eldest son of Sultan Mohammed V, and his second wife, Lalla Abla bint Tahar. He was the first commander-in-chief of the Royal Armed Forces and was named crown prince in 1957. He was enthroned as king in 1961 following his father's death. Hassan's reign was marked by the start of the Western Sahara conflict and the Sand War. He was also the target of two failed coup d'états in 1971 and in 1972. Hassan's conservative rule reportedly strengthened the his rule over Morocco and over Western Sahara. He was accused of authoritarian practices and human rights, civil rights abuses, particularly during the Years of Lead. A truth commission was set up after his death to investigate allegations of human rights violations during his reign.

Early life 
Mawlay al-Hassan bin Mohammed bin Yusef al-Alawi was born on 9 July 1929, at the Dar al-Makhzen in Rabat during the French Protectorate of Morocco as the eldest son to Sultan Mohammed V and his 2nd wife, Lalla Abla bint Tahar, as a member of the 'Alawi dynasty.

Hassan first studied Islamic sciences at the Dar al-Makhzen in Fez, he later went to the Royal College in Rabat, where instruction was in Arabic and French and a class was created for him, Mehdi Ben Barka was notably his mathematics teacher for four years at the Royal College.

In 1943, a 12-year-old Hassan attended the Casablanca Conference at the Anfa Hotel along with his father, where he met U.S. President Franklin D. Roosevelt, Prime Minister Winston Churchill and General Charles de Gaulle.

In 1947, Prince Hassan participated in his father's speech in Tangier (then part of the Tangier International Zone). In the speech, Sultan Mohammed wished for the French Protectorate of Morocco, the Spanish protectorate of Morocco and the Tangier International Zone to be unified into one nation. The speech quickly became a reference for Moroccan nationalists and anti-colonial movements, according to the Office of the High Commissioner for Former Resistance Fighters and Members of the Army of Liberation, the speech was a "a turning point in [Morocco's] march for independence and its fight for the solemn claim of its independence, the recovery of its sovereignty and the consecration of the unity of the nation".

Hassan later claimed that he had "profound resentment" towards the protectorate and that he felt "deep humiliation" from French colonialism, despite paying hommage to Hubert Lyautey, the first resident-general of the French protectorate, he was highly critical of Lyautey's successors, noting their "stubborn stupidity" and "total insensitivity".

In 1952, Prince Hassan earned a master's degree in public law from the University of Bordeaux before serving in the French Navy on board the Jeanne d'Arc cruiser.

He was forced into exile by French authorities on 20 August 1953, along with his family and father, they were deported to Zonza, Corsica. Their deportation caused protests and further fueled the anti-colonial movement. They moved to the city of L'Île-Rousse and were living in the Napoléon Bonaparte hotel for five months before being transferred to Antsirabe, Madagascar in January 1954. Prince Hassan acted as his father's political advisor during the exile. They later returned from exile on 16 November 1955. During the exile, Mohammed Ben Aarafa was named as the Sultan by the French government in Morocco, however, the Moroccan government doesn't recognize the title.

Prince Hassan participated in the February 1956 negotiations for Morocco's independence with his father. Following Morocco's independence from France, his father appointed him as the first Commander in Chief of the newly founded Royal Moroccan Armed Forces in April 1956. 
 
The same year, he led army contingents to victory after defeating rebel militias during the Rif revolt.

It was during his tenure as Commander in Chief of the Royal Armed Forces that Hassan met General Mohamed Oufkir, who became the Minister of Defense during Hassan II's reign. Oufkir was later suspected of orchestrating a failed coup d'état to kill Hassan. After Mohammed V changed the title of the Moroccan sovereign from Sultan to King in 1957, Hassan was proclaimed Crown Prince on 9 July 1957. He was named prime minister in 1961.

Reign 
On 26 February 1961, Crown Prince Hassan became the King of Morocco after his father's death from heart failure following a minor surgery. He was enthroned in the Royal Palace of Rabat on 3 March 1961. His first official visit to a foreign country as King was when attending the 1st Summit of the Non-Aligned Movement in Belgrade.

Domestic reforms 

In 1962, Hassan II and his aides wrote the Kingdom of Morocco's first constitution, defining the kingdom as a social and democratic constitutional monarchy, made Islam the state religion, and gave the king, whose person was defined as "inviolable and sacred", the title of Amir al-Mu'minin and "supreme representative of the nation". The constitution also reaffirmed Morocco's choice of a multi-party political system, the only one in the Maghreb at that time. The constitution provoked strong political protest from the UNFP and the Istiqlal and other leftist parties that formed the opposition at the time.

In June 1965, in the aftermath of prior riots, Hassan dissolved the Parliament and suspended the constitution of 1962, declaring a state of exception that would last more than five years, he ruled Morocco directly, however, he did not completely abolish the mechanisms of parliamentary democracy. An alleged report from the U.S. Secretary of State claimed that, during this period, "Hassan [appeared] obsessed with the preservation of his power rather than with its application toward the resolution of Morocco's multiplying domestic problems."

In 1990, following riots in Fez, Hassan set up the Consultative Human Rights Council to look into allegations of abuse by the State. In 1991, he pardoned 2000 prisoners, including political prisoners and people held in secret prisons including the ones in Tazmamart. In 1998, the first opposition-led government was elected by Hassan.

Attempted coup d'états 

In the early 1970s, King Hassan survived two assassination attempts. The attempted coups reportedly enforced Hassan's rule over Morocco. The first coup attempt, dubbed by the media as the Skhirat coup attempt, occurred on 10 July 1971, at 14:02 (GMT), during Hassan's forty-second birthday party at his palace in Skhirat, near Rabat. The attempted coup was carried out by an armed militia of approximately 1,000 led by General Mohamed Medbouh and Colonel M'hamed Ababou. Hassan was reported to have hidden in a bathroom whilst grenades were thrown and rapid shots were fired. After firing died down, Hassan ended up face-to-face with one of the rebel commanders; he reportedly intimidated the leader of the rebel troops by reciting a verse of the Quran, and the commander knelt and kissed Hassan's right hand. An estimated 400 people were killed by rebels during the attempted coup; loyal troops within the Royal Moroccan Armed Forces under the command of Hassan killed more than 150 and detained 900 people in connection with the coup. The rebels also raided the offices of the RTM, Morocco's state-owned broadcasting company, and took over broadcasting during the coup, with propaganda being broadcast claiming that the King had been murdered and that a republic had been founded. M'hamed Ababou gave orders to rebels through Radio-Maroc, ordering the execution of everyone in the palace by asking that "dinner be served to everyone by 7 pm" on air. The coup ended the same day when royalist troops took over the palace in combat against the rebels. It was subsequently claimed by the Moroccan authorities that the young cadets had been misled by senior officers into thinking that they were acting to protect the king. Hassan himself supported the thesis that the coup was supported by Libya, raising tensions between the two countries. The next day, Hassan attended the funerals of royalist soldiers killed during the attempted coup.

On 16 August 1972, at 17:05 (GMT), during a second attempt, dubbed by the media as the Airmen's coup, six F-5 military jets from the Royal Moroccan Air Force opened fire on the King's Boeing 727 while flying at 3,000 metres altitude over Tétouan on the way to Rabat from Barcelona, following a meeting with Gregorio López-Bravo, the Spanish Minister of Foreign Affairs at the time, killing eight people on board and injuring fifty. A bullet hit the fuselage but they failed to take the plane down despite it being badly damaged. The military jets were loaded with practice ammunition rather than missiles, severely impacting the coup's effectiveness. Hassan hurried to the cockpit, took control of the radio, and reportedly shouted: "Stop firing, the tyrant is dead!"; however, conflicting reports state that he posed as a mechanic and stated that both pilots died and the king was badly injured, convincing the pilots to stop. 220 members of the Royal Moroccan Air Force were arrested for partaking in the coup plot, 177 of whom were acquitted, 32 were found guilty, and 11 people were sentenced to death by a military tribunal. After doing an emergency landing at Rabat–Salé International Airport, Hassan escaped to his palace in Shkirat in an unmarked car. Mohamed Amekrane, a colonel suspected to be a main part of the coup, attempted to flee to Gibraltar; however, his asylum application was declined and he was sent back to Morocco. He was later sentenced to death by firing squad. General Mohammed Oufkir, Morocco's defense minister at the time, was suspected to be leading the coup and was later found dead from multiple gunshot wounds, the death was officially declared a suicide. Hassan declared that he "must not place [his] trust in anyone" after what he perceived as treason from Oufkir.

Armed conflicts 
On 14 October 1963, the Sand War was declared as a result of failed negotiations over borders inherited from French colonialism between Hassan II and Algeria's newly elected president Ahmed Ben Bella. The war heavily damaged both countries economy, Hassan asked citizens to not celebrate Eid al-Adha due to the economic recession caused by the war. A peace treaty and armistice ended the war in on 15 January 1969.  He later claimed that the Sand War was "stupid and a real setback". Hassan sent 11,000 troops, one infantry brigade to Egypt and one armored regiment to Syria during Yom Kippur War in 1973. 6 Moroccan troops were captured during the war. During Hassan II's reign, Morocco recovered the Spanish-controlled area of Ifni in 1969, and gained control of two-thirds of what was formerly Spanish Sahara through the Green March in 1975.

Foreign policy 

In the Cold War era, Hassan II allied Morocco with the West generally, and with the United States in particular, after his death, The New York Times called him "a monarch oriented to the west". There were close and continuing ties between Hassan II's government and the CIA, who helped to reorganize Morocco's security forces in 1960. During Hassan's tenure as prime minister, Morocco controversially accepted Soviet military aid and made overtures towards Moscow. During an interview, Hassan stated that "as an Islamic people, [Morocco has] the right to practice bigamy. We can wed East and West and be faithful to both". In 1974, he created the Bayt Mal Al Qods Acharif Agency (BMAQ), a non-governmental organization created to "preserve the Arab-Muslim character" of Jerusalem, the agency works on the restoration of mosques and the creation of hospitals and schools in the city. BMAQ also gives out scholarship to students living in the city, as well as donating equipment to schools and kindergartens.

Hassan II was alleged to have covertly cooperated with the State of Israel and Israeli intelligence. In Operation Yachin, he allowed over 97,000 Moroccan Jews to be migrated to Israel from 1961 to 1964 in exchange for weapons and training for Morocco's security forces and intelligence agencies. In an arrangement financed by the American Hebrew Immigrant Aid Society (HIAS), Hassan II was paid a sum of $500,000 along with $100 for each of the first 50,000 Moroccan Jews to be migrated to Israel, and $250 for each Jewish emigrant thereafter.

Hassan served as a mediator between Arab countries and Israel. In 1977, he served as a key backchannel in peace talks between Egypt and Israel, hosting secret meetings between Israeli and Egyptian officials, these meetings led to the Egypt–Israel peace treaty.

According to Shlomo Gazit during an interview with Yedioth Ahronoth, then-leader of the Military Intelligence Directorate, Hassan II invited Mossad and Shin Bet agents to bug the Casablanca hotel where the Arab League Summit of September 1965 would be held to record the conversations of the Arab leaders and helped Israel win the Six-Day War. This information was instrumental in Israel's victory in the Six-Day War. Ronen Bergman claimed in his book, Rise And Kill First, that Israeli intelligence then supplied information leading to Mehdi Ben Barka's capture and assassination in October. Bergman also alleged that the Moroccan DST and Mossad collaborated in a 1996 plot to assassinate Osama bin Laden, the plot involved a woman close to bin Laden who was an informant for the DST, however, the mission was aborted due to rising tensions between Morocco and Israel.

Relations with Algeria have deteriorated sharply due to the previous Sand War and the Western Sahara conflict, with Algeria unconditionally backing and funding the Polisario Front since its creation in 1973. Relations with Mauritania during the Western Sahara conflict were less than ideal, with Morocco recognizing Mauritania as a sovereign country in 1969, nearly a decade after Mauritania's declaration of independence. During the 20th congress of the Organization of African Unity, Hassan II went on stage and declared that Morocco's membership of the OAU was suspended as a result of the Sahrawi Arab Democratic Republic joining the OAU. Morocco entered into a diplomatic crisis with Burkinabe President Thomas Sankara following his decision to recognize the Sahrawi Arab Democratic Republic.

Hassan II was close with Shah Mohammed Reza Pahlavi of Iran, even hosting him in 1979 when he was exiled.

Economy 
Economically, Hassan II adopted a market-based economy, where agriculture, tourism, and phosphates mining industries played a major role. In 1967, he launched an irrigation project consisting of over 1 million hectares of land.

Hassan eventually came to develop very good relations with France, especially with parts of the French media and financial elite. In 1988, the contract for the construction of the Great Mosque of Casablanca, a considerable project in scale, financed through compulsory contributions, was awarded to Francis Bouygues, one of the most powerful businessmen in France and personal friend of the King. His image in France was tarnished however following the publication in 1990 of Gilles Perrault's Our Friend the King, in which the writer describes the conditions of detention in the Tazmamart prison, the repression of left-wing opponents and Sahrawis, political assassinations, but also the social situation and the poverty in which the majority of Moroccans live. 

On 3 March 1973, Hassan II announced a "Moroccanization" policy, in which state-held assets, agricultural lands, and businesses that were more than 50 percent foreign-owned were taken over and transferred to local companies and businessmen. The "Moroccanisation" of the economy affected thousands of businesses and the proportion of industrial businesses in Morocco that were Moroccan-owned immediately increased from 18% to 55%. 2/3 of the wealth of the "Moroccanised" economy was concentrated in 36 Moroccan families. In 1988, he also adopted a privatization policy, by 1993, more than a hundred public companies were privatized.

From the 1990s onwards, a large-scale operation to privatize public companies was carried out by the king and André Azoulay, the monarchy's economic advisor. The French group Accor was thus able to acquire six hotels of the Moroccan chain Moussafir and the management of the Jamaï Palace in Fez. This privatization operation enabled Moroccan notables close to the government to control the most prominent public companies, and French companies to make a strong comeback in the country's economy. The royal family acquired the mining group Monagem.

Human rights 

Hassan's reign was infamous for a poor human rights record labeled as "appalling" by the BBC. It was however, at its worst during the period from the 1960s to the late 1980s, which was labelled as the "years of lead" and saw thousands of dissidents jailed, killed, exiled or forcibly disappeared. During this time, Morocco was one of the most repressive and undemocratic nations in the world. However, Morocco has been labeled as "partly free" by Freedom House, except in 1992 and 2014 when the country was labeled "Not free" in those years respectively. The country would only become more democratic by the early 1990s amid strong international pressure and condemnation over the nation's human rights record. Due to the strong rebuke from other nations and human rights groups, and also because of the realistic threat of international isolation, Hassan II would then gradually democratize the nation over time. Since then, Morocco's human rights record has improved modestly and improved significantly following the death of Hassan II.

Hassan II imprisoned many members of the National Union of Popular Forces and sentenced some party leaders, including Mehdi Ben Barka, to death. Student protests that took place 21 March 1965 in Casablanca, and devolved into general riots the following day; their violent repression caused hundreds of deaths. In the aftermath, on 26 March, Hassan II gave a speech that he concluded with: "There is no greater danger to a country than a so-called intellectual; it would have been better if you had all been illiterate."

In October 1965, Mehdi Ben Barka, the main political opponent and fierce critic of Hassan II, was kidnapped and disappeared in Paris. In Rise and Kill First, Ronen Bergman points to cooperation between the Moroccan authorities and Mossad in locating Ben Barka.

Death 
On 23 July 1999 at 16:30 (GMT), Hassan II was pronounced dead from a myocardial infarction by the CHU Ibn Sina Hospital in Rabat, having been hospitalized earlier that day for acute interstitial pneumonitis; he was 70 years old. The Moroccan government ordered forty days of mourning, while entertainment and cultural events were cancelled, and public institutions and many businesses were closed upon news of the king's death. Days of mourning were also declared in several other countries, the majority being Arab states. A national funeral service was held for him in Rabat on 25 July, with over 40 world leaders in attendance, including UN Secretary-General Kofi Annan, U.S. President Bill Clinton, French President Chirac, Chairman of the PLO Yasser Arafat, Algerian President Abdelaziz Bouteflika, King Abdullah II of Jordan, Israeli Prime Minister Ehud Barak, Italian President Carlo Azeglio Ciampi, Egyptian President Hosni Moubarak, King Juan Carlos I of Spain, Emir of Kuwait Jaber Al-Ahmad Al-Sabah and Syrian President Hafez al-Assad.

He was buried in a wooden coffin at the Mausoleum of Mohammed V. During Hassan's funeral, his coffin was carried by his son and successor, now King Mohammed VI, his brother Prince Moulay Rachid and his cousin Moulay Hicham, was covered with a red cloth, in which the Shahada, an Islamic testimony of faith, is inscribed in golden writing. His first son, Mohammed VI was enthroned and became the de jure King of Morocco a week after Hassan's death.

Honors and decorations

National orders
  Grand Master of the Order of Muhammad
  Grand Master of the Order of the Throne
  Grand Master of the Order of the Independence
  Grand Master of the Order of Ouissam Alaouite
  Grand Master of the Order of Fidelity
  Grand Master of the Order of Military Merit
  Grand Master of the National Order of Merit
  Grand Master of the National Order of Prosperity

Foreign orders
  Grand Star of the Order of Merit of the Austrian Republic 
  Grand Collar of the Order of al-Khalifa of Bahrain
  Grand Cordon of the Order of Leopold of Belgium
  Grand Cross of the Royal Order of Cambodia 
  Knight of the Order of the Elephant of Denmark
  Grand Cordon of the Order of the Nile of Egypt
  Grand Cross of the Legion of Honour of France
  Grand Cross Special Class of the Order of Merit of the Federal Republic of Germany 
  Grand Cross of the Order of the Redeemer of Greece
  Grand Collar of the Order of Pahlavi of Iran
  Grand Cordon of the Order of the Two Rivers of Iraq
  Knight Grand Cross with Collar of Order of Merit of the Italian Republic
  Collar of the Order of al-Hussein bin Ali of Jordan
  Collar of the Order of Mubarak the Great of Kuwait 
  Extraordinary Grade of the Order of Merit of Lebanon
  Grand Cordon of the Order of Idris I of Libya
  Grand Cross of the National Order of Mali of Mali 
  Grand Cordon of the Order of National Merit of Mauritania 
  Knight Grand Cross of the Order of the Netherlands Lion
  Special Class of the Order of Oman 
  Grand Cross of the Order of Pakistan, First Class
  Grand Collar of the Order of Prince Henry of Portugal
  Grand Cross of the Order of the Tower and Sword of Portugal
  Grand Cordon of the Order of the Independence of Qatar 
  Order of Abdulaziz al Saud of Saudi Arabia, 1st Class
  Collar of Civil Order of Alfonso X, the Wise of Spain 
  Collar of the Order of Charles III of Spain 
  Grand Cordon of the Order of Merit of Sudan
  Wissam of the Order of Oumayid of Syria
  Knight of the Royal Order of the Seraphim (Sweden)
  Grand Cordon of the Order of the Republic of Tunisia 
  Grand Collar of the Order of the Seventh of November of Tunisia
  Honorary Knight Grand Cross of the Order of the Bath of Great Britain and Northern Ireland
  Honorary Knight Grand Cross of the Royal Victorian Order of Great Britain and Northern Ireland
  Collar of the Order of Etihad (Order of the Federation)
  Yugoslav Great Star

Honorary prizes 
 On 1 November 2022, Hassan was posthumously awarded the Pan-African Prize for his contributions to the establishment of the African Union and Pan-Africanism.

Personal life

Morocco's Royal Palace described Hassan in an official biography after his death as "well versed in the fields of architecture, medicine and technology" and that he gave his children a "strong commitment to the search for learning and a dedication to uphold the values of their country and their people". Hassan was fluent in Arabic and French and spoke "capable English".

In 1956, Hassan, who was then prince, started a relationship with French actress Etchika Choureau, who he met in Cannes in 1956. The relationship ended in 1961 after Hassan's ascension to the royal throne. In 1961, King Hassan II married Lalla Latifa Amahzoune, an ethnic Zayane. Hassan and Amahzoune had five children:

 Princess Lalla Meryem (born on 26 August 1962)
 King Mohammed VI (born 21 August 1963)
 Princess Lalla Asma (born on 29 September 1965)
 Princess Lalla Hasna (born on 19 November 1967)
 Prince Moulay Rachid (born on 20 June 1970)

Bibliography

See also
Mohammed VI of Morocco
Mohammed V of Morocco
List of rulers of Morocco
History of Morocco

Notes

References

External links

History of Morocco

 
1929 births
1999 deaths
'Alawi dynasty
Kings of Morocco
Moroccan Muslims
Moroccan people of Arab descent
Moroccan anti-communists
People from Rabat
Muslim monarchs
20th-century Moroccan businesspeople
Moroccan Army officers
Alumni of the Collège Royal (Rabat)
Moroccan exiles in Madagascar
Recipients of the Civil Order of Alfonso X, the Wise
Honorary Knights Grand Cross of the Order of the Bath
Grand Croix of the Légion d'honneur
Grand Collars of the Order of Saint James of the Sword
Knights Grand Cross of the Royal Order of Cambodia
Recipients of the Grand Star of the Decoration for Services to the Republic of Austria
Grand Collars of the Order of Prince Henry
20th-century Arabs
University of Bordeaux alumni
Recipients of orders, decorations, and medals of Sudan